Auditing, Review and Other Standards (formerly known as AAS) are the standards issued by Institute of Chartered Accountants of India.

Companies Act 2013 mandate the auditors to comply with auditing standards.

References

Auditing